Pervez Taufiq (born November 27, 1974 in Lowell, Massachusetts), is both the vocalist and primary songwriter for the hard rock band, Living syndication. Taufiq has been described as "a thinking man's musician" and is also a rhythm guitarist, performing both on albums and during live shows. He is the son of Farook and Sheerin Taufiq (of Indian origin) and has a younger sister named Reshma.

Biography

Living Syndication
Pervez began playing piano at an early age and found himself with an affinity for the electric guitar. After playing in high school bands, he developed an interest in singing but would abandon it till his solo project, which turned into the band Living syndication.

References

External links
 Official Living Syndication website
 Official website for Pervez Taufiq

1974 births
American rock songwriters
American rock singers
Living people
Musicians from Lowell, Massachusetts
Singer-songwriters from Massachusetts
21st-century American singers